Vroman is an unincorporated community in Otero County, in the U.S. state of Colorado.

History
A variant name was Weitzer.  A post office called Weitzer was established in 1908, the name was changed to Vroman in 1918, and the post office closed in 1954. The community has the name of one Mr. Vroman, a local pioneer.

References

Unincorporated communities in Otero County, Colorado
Unincorporated communities in Colorado